Jocelyne Chantal Lanois is a Canadian musician, bass player and songwriter from Hull, Quebec, who has been a member of the bands Martha and the Muffins and Crash Vegas. She has also had touring stints as bassplayer with Ani DiFranco and Chris Whitley, and played on Sarah McLachlan's album Solace. She is the sister of record producer Daniel Lanois, and was partner at his experimental Lab Studio with producer, musician Malcolm Burn, collaborating on his solo release, Redemption.

Lanois went on to develop a career in scoring music for films and documentaries. Between 2006 and 2008 she wrote and recorded songs in collaboration with Martha Johnson, Mark Gane and Leonardo Valvassori, playing bass, guitar, percussion and vocals.

References 

Canadian pop guitarists
Canadian folk guitarists
Canadian women folk guitarists
Living people
Musicians from Gatineau
Musicians from Toronto
Canadian new wave musicians
Women bass guitarists
Crash Vegas members
Martha and the Muffins members
20th-century Canadian bass guitarists
20th-century Canadian women musicians
21st-century Canadian bass guitarists
21st-century Canadian women musicians
Year of birth missing (living people)